Fernwood may refer to:

Places
 Canada
 Fernwood, Greater Victoria, a neighbourhood of Victoria, British Columbia
 Fernwood, Halifax, a Gothic Revival–style villa designated as a National Historic Site of Canada

 South Africa
 Fernwood, a suburb in Somerset West

 United Kingdom
 Fernwood, Nottinghamshire, a parish in Newark and Sherwood District

 United States of America
 Fernwood, California (disambiguation), multiple locations
 Fernwood, Idaho
 Fernwood, Chicago, Illinois
 Fernwood, Mississippi
 Fernwood Botanical Garden and Nature Preserve, Niles, Michigan
 Fernwood, New Jersey
 Fernwood, Ohio

Other uses
Fernwood Publishing, a book publishing company specialising in books about left-wing politics
Fernwood 2Nite, a comedic television program from 1977